Tim Kearney may refer to:

 Tim Kearney (American football), American football player
 Tim Kearney (politician), American politician from Pennsylvania